The 1989 Hall of Fame Bowl featured the 17th-ranked Syracuse Orangemen and the 16th-ranked LSU Tigers. It was the third edition of the Hall of Fame Bowl.

Syracuse scored first following a 2-yard Robert Drummond touchdown, and led 7–0 after one quarter. In the second quarter, Syracuse added a 38-yard field goal to take a 10–0 lead. LSU got on the scoreboard, following a 19-yard touchdown run by Calvin Windom getting to 10–7.

In the third quarter, avid Browndyke kicked a 35-yard field goal to tie the game at 10. Robert Drummond scored on a 1-yard run late in the third quarter as Syracuse led 17–10. Syracuse added a 4-yard touchdown pass from Todd Philcox to Deval Glover for a 23-10 lead. Syracuse held on to win by that same margin.

The loss marked the beginning of a dark period for LSU football. The Tigers recorded six consecutive losing seasons from 1989 through 1994, leading to the resignation of coach Mike Archer following the 1990 season and the dismissal of his successor, Curley Hallman, after four seasons. LSU did not return to a New Year's Day bowl game until 2001, by which time it had fired another coach, Gerry DiNardo.

References

Hall of Fame Bowl
ReliaQuest Bowl
LSU Tigers football bowl games
Syracuse Orange football bowl games
Hall of Fame Bowl
20th century in Tampa, Florida
January 1989 sports events in the United States